Océanne Muller (born 2 January 2003) is a French sports shooter. She competed in the women's 10 metre air rifle event at the 2020 Summer Olympics, finishing in fifth place. She won two gold medals at the 2022 Mediterranean Games held in Oran, Algeria.

References

External links
 

2003 births
Living people
French female sport shooters
Olympic shooters of France
Shooters at the 2020 Summer Olympics
Mediterranean Games gold medalists for France
Mediterranean Games medalists in shooting
Competitors at the 2022 Mediterranean Games
Place of birth missing (living people)
21st-century French women